Anna Abreu is the self-titled debut album by Finnish singer and season three Idols runner-up Anna Abreu, released in Finland by RCA on August 22, 2007. "End of Love" was released as the album's lead single, followed by "Ivory Tower", and "Are You Ready" (a cover of the 2005 hit by Australian duo Shakaya).

The album debuted at number one on the Finnish albums chart and was certified platinum within its first week after selling close to 30,000 copies. The album remained on the chart for a staggering thirty-seven weeks, thirteen of which were spent within the top five. To date it has sold over 86,000 copies, is certified double platinum and ranked as the fortieth best-performing album of all time in Finland. To date it is the highest selling album by an Idols alumnus.

Commercial performance
Anna Abreu debuted at number one on the Finnish Top 40 albums chart, selling almost 30,000 copies in its first week, enough to be certified platinum. To date it holds the record for the highest sales in one week by any Idols contestant. It dropped to number two in its second week, but continued to stay in the top five for its first ten weeks. In its thirty-third week on the chart, the album suddenly rose from number eighteen to seven after selling almost 4000 copies. In total it spent thirty-seven weeks on the official Top 40 chart. In December 2007, Anna Abreu was certified double platinum and to date has sold over 86,000 copies.

Chart performance

Singles
 "End of Love", the first single from the album debuted and peaked at number eight on the Finnish singles chart. It remained on the chart for three weeks, however it also reached number one on the digital chart and its popularity continued for many months, allowing it to gain gold certification for the sale of over 5,000 copies.
 "Ivory Tower" was released as the second single and would prove to be the most successful. It peaked at number five on the official singles chart and the number two spot of the digital list. It remained on the official chart for ten weeks and was certified gold for the sale of 5,000 copies.
 "Are You Ready", the third and final single from the album was released for promotional purposes only, and as such did appear on the official singles chart. It did however, manage a peak of number seventeen on the digital list.

Track listing

Promotion

From 2007 to 2008, Abreu promoted her debut album with the Anna Abreu Live Tour throughout Finland.

Setlist

Tour dates

References

2007 albums
Anna Abreu albums